This may refer to:
 This, the singular proximal demonstrative pronoun

Places
 This, or Thinis, an ancient city in Upper Egypt
 This, Ardennes, a commune in France

People with the surname
 Hervé This, French culinary chemist

Arts, entertainment, and media

Music

Albums
 This (Peter Hammill album) (1998)
 This (The Motels album) (2008)

Songs
 "This" (Darius Rucker song) (2010)
 "This", a 2015 song by Collective Soul from See What You Started by Continuing
 "This", a 2011 song by Ed Sheeran from +
 "This", a 1993 song by Hemingway Corner
 "This", a 2021 song by Megan McKenna
 "This", a 1995 song by Rod Stewart from A Spanner in the Works

Periodicals
 This (Canadian magazine), a political journal
 This (journal), a poetry journal published in the US from 1971–1982

Television
 "This" (The X-Files), season 11 episode 2  of The X-Files
 This TV, a US TV channel

Other uses
 this (computer programming), the identity function in many object-oriented computer languages
 This (fly), a genus of Australian kelp fly
 This, a brand of cigarettes made by Korea Tobacco & Ginseng Corporation